Briarwood Elementary School may refer to:

Briarwood Christian School in Birmingham, Alabama, which includes elementary grades
Briarwood Elementary School (Prairie Village, Kansas), in the Shawnee Mission School District
Briarwood Elementary School (Bowling Green, Kentucky), in Warren County, Kentucky
Briarwood Elementary School (Florham Park, New Jersey), in Florham Park School District
Briarwood Elementary School (Issaquah, Washington)
Briarwood Elementary School (Moore, Oklahoma), in Moore Public Schools District